QGPS refers to:
 Great Public Schools Association of Queensland Inc., a number of boys secondary schools in Queensland
 Quasi-differential GPS, a postprocessing method of  differential GPS using only one receiver.